Jack and the Cuckoo-Clock Heart is a 2013 French 3D computer-animated musical fantasy film based on the novel La Mécanique du cœur written by the band's lead singer Mathias Malzieu, and the concept album by the French rock band Dionysos. The music of the film was entirely composed by Dionysos.

The original French language version, Jack et la mécanique du cœur, which translates literally as Jack and the Mechanic of the Heart, was released in October 2013, with English, German, Finnish, and Spanish-language versions following in 2014.

Summary
In Edinburgh, Scotland 1874, Jack is born on the coldest day ever. Due to the extreme cold, he is born with a frozen heart that will not beat. The attendant midwife Madeleine saves his life by replacing his heart with a fragile but working cuckoo clock. She then advises him of three rules to prevent his untimely death: he must never play with the hands of the clock, lose his temper, or fall in love. Jack's mother, for reasons known only to her, quickly decides her child would be better raised by Madeleine and departs, leaving Jack. Madeleine, incapable of bearing children of her own, raises and loves him as her own.

On Jack's tenth birthday, Madeleine repeats the three rules before taking him into town for the first time. He meets a girl in town named Miss Acacia and becomes infatuated with her. After starting school shortly afterward, he also meets Joe, a bully who is in love with Miss Acacia as well. Jealous, the older boy and his gang of students torment Jack for the next four years. During an assault from Joe, the cuckoo of Jack's clock heart gouges Joe's eye, and Jack runs home believing he had murdered Joe. Madeleine, believing Jack to be a fugitive, helps him to escape.

Jack only wants to see Miss Acacia again and eventually meets up with Georges Méliès, a magician attempting to operate an early film camera. Georges helps repair his heart and agrees to join Jack in the search for Miss Acacia. They proceed to Andalusia, Spain in search of her.

After a long journey, they arrive at a circus in Andalusia. Jack finds Miss Acacia but Georges advises him against revealing his identity to her. He proceeds to befriend her and foolishly avoids sharing his feelings. She hints that her heart belongs to someone from her past. It turns out that Jack was that person from her past. Jack eventually finds a way to reveal himself and gives a key to Miss Acacia which can be used to wind his heart.

Before Jack and Miss Acacia could run away together, Joe, the bully from Jack's past, shows up. He had been looking for an opportunity to further punish Jack and explains to her the three rules of Jack's cuckoo clock heart in an attempt to sabotage them. Miss Acacia, after talking with Joe, decides she doesn't want to risk being the cause of death of Jack by allowing him to fall in love. She rejects him and leaves with Joe. Jack, after being rejected, tears at the screws of his heart.

In the carriage with Miss Acacia and Joe, he tells her that soon after Jack escaped with Madeleine's help, Madeleine was sent to prison. There, she died soon afterward. Rumors said that she died of a broken heart. Miss Acacia eventually realizes she holds the key to Jack's survival and returns to search for him. She finds out quickly Jack had departed for home in Edinburgh and follows behind him. She knows she has only a short time to reach him. When he reaches home, he is told what happened to Madeleine. They also tell Jack that he gave her the joy of being a mother and she worried at the thought of how he will grow up.

Miss Acacia finds Jack in front of Madeleine's grave, shivering in the cold. She tries to use the key to turn his clock but he throws away the key, choosing to die from not using the key. Then they finally kiss. When Jack breaks the kiss, the time has stopped for him. A song plays in the background about climbing to Heaven while using the frozen snowflakes as a ladder, ascending into the sky as the film fades to black and ends the movie.

Cast
 Mathias Malzieu and Orlando Seale (English version) as Jack
 Olivia Ruiz (French version) and Samantha Barks (English version) as Miss Acacia
 Grand Corps Malade and Harry Sadeghi (English version) as Joe
 Marie Vincent and Emily Loizeau and Barbara Scaff (English version) as Madeleine
 Jean Rochefort and Stéphane Cornicard (English version) as Georges Méliès
 Rossy de Palma and Jessie Buckley (English version) as Luna
 Arthur H and Richard Ridings(English version) as Arthur
 Dani and Michelle Fairley (English version) as Brigette Heim
 Alain Bashung and Howard Samuels (English version) as Jack the Ripper
 Cali and Steve Nicholson (English version) as The crying man

Production
The directors are Stéphane Berla (the director of the band's previous video clips) and Mathias Malzieu. The film was originally set to be released on 17 October 2012 in France but was delayed until October 2013 by unrevealed causes. It was later revealed that the bankruptcy of the French animation studio Duran Duboi (from Quinta group) led to the delay.

Recognitions and Award Nominations
The film received much recognition in the animation industry:

 It was chosen as the opening film for the 25th anniversary of the CineMagic film festival.
 It was one of three films nominated for the 2014 European Film Award for Best Animated Feature Film, but lost to The Art of Happiness (film).
 It was one of three films nominated for the 2015 César Award for Best Animated Film, but lost to Minuscule: Valley of the Lost Ants.
 It was one of twenty films submitted to the 87th Academy Awards for consideration in the Animated Feature Film category, but was not chosen.

References

External links 
 
 

2010s romantic fantasy films
French animated fantasy films
2010s French animated films
French independent films
French animated feature films
2013 animated films
2013 films
Films set in Edinburgh
Films set in Scotland
Films set in Spain
Films set in the 19th century
Films produced by Luc Besson
Belgian animated fantasy films
Films based on multiple works
Films based on French novels
Cultural depictions of Georges Méliès
EuropaCorp films